The 2018 Vuelta a Castilla y León was the 33rd edition of the Vuelta a Castilla y León cycle race and was held on 20 April to 22 April 2018. The race started in Alba de Tormes and finished in Ávila. The race was won by Rubén Plaza.

General classification

References

Further reading

Vuelta a Castilla y León
Vuelta a Castilla y León by year
2018 in Spanish sport